Ed Hunt (born March 17, 1977 in Midland, Ontario, Canada) is a former professional mountain bike racer and is credited as the first person to complete a 24 hour mountain bike race as a solo rider. In 2006 Hunt was a cast member on Discover Channel reality series Star Racer.

References

1977 births
Living people
Canadian male cyclists
Cyclists from Ontario
Canadian mountain bikers